Sir Chung-kong Chow , FREng, FCGI, FIChemE (born 9 September 1950), also known as Chow Chung-kong and C.K. Chow, is a former non-official member of the Executive Council of Hong Kong, and the chairman of Hong Kong Exchanges and Clearing, which owns the Hong Kong stock exchange.

Chow is a former chief executive officer of the MTR Corporation, and was formerly chief executive officer of Brambles Industries PLC, a global support services company with dual listings in the United Kingdom and Australia, before resigning on 25 September 2003 after being blamed by shareholders at the AGM the year before for making mistakes. From 1997 to 2001, he was chief executive of GKN PLC, a leading engineering company based in the United Kingdom and before that he spent 20 years with the BOC Group PLC and was appointed a director of its board and chief executive of its Gases Division in 1993.

Chow is a chartered engineer. He holds BS and MS degrees in Chemical Engineering from the University of Wisconsin–Madison and the University of California-Davis respectively. He also holds an MBA degree from The Chinese University of Hong Kong and attended the six-week Advanced Management Program of Harvard Business School. He was awarded an Honorary Doctor of Engineering degree by the University of Bath in 2001.

Chow was knighted in the United Kingdom in 2000 for his contribution to industry. He is a member of the Council of the Hong Kong Institute of Certified Public Accountants, the Hong Kong Tourism Board, the Council of The Chinese University of Hong Kong and as the Council's representative to serve on the Board of Trustees of its Shaw College.

Chow is also a member of the general committee of the Hong Kong General Chamber of Commerce, and the Shenzhen Municipal Committee of the Chinese People's Political Consultative Conference. He was a non-executive director of Standard Chartered plc and until the end of 2010 was non-executive chairman of Standard Chartered Bank (Hong Kong). He was appointed chairman of HKEx in April 2012 and as a Fellow at the Royal Academy of Engineering in 2001.

The Hong Kong media once described Chow as one of the most powerful Chinese men in the western world.

See also
Overseas Chinese

References

Living people
Hong Kong chief executives
Alumni of the University of Bath
Businesspeople awarded knighthoods
Knights Bachelor
Recipients of the Gold Bauhinia Star
MTR Corporation
Standard Chartered
University of Wisconsin–Madison College of Engineering alumni
Members of the Election Committee of Hong Kong, 2007–2012
Members of the Election Committee of Hong Kong, 2012–2017
Members of the Election Committee of Hong Kong, 2021–2026
University of California, Davis alumni
1950 births
Members of the Executive Council of Hong Kong